The Women's Artistic Gymnastics competition for the 2014 Pacific Rim Gymnastics Championships was held on 9 April, 11 April, & 12 April 2014 at the Richmond Olympic Oval. The juniors and seniors competed together in the team final and individual all-around, but competed separately during the event finals. The team final and all-around competition were held on 9 April, the junior event finals were held on 11 April, and the senior event finals were held on 12 April.

Team 

Results

Senior

All-Around 

Results

Vault 
Results

Uneven Bars 
Results

Balance Beam 
Results

Floor 
Results

Junior

All-Around 
Results

*Norah Flatley scored the 3rd highest score of the competition but medals are limited to two per country

Vault 
Results

Uneven Bars 
Results

Balance Beam 
Results

Floor 
Results

References

Pacific Rim Championships
Pacific Rim Gymnastics Championships